Mkak is a sangkat of Krong Serei Saophoan (previously, a khum/commune of Serei Saophoan District) in Banteay Meanchey Province in north-western Cambodia.

Villages

 Mkak(ម្កាក់)
 Kbal Spean(ក្បាលស្ពាន)
 Ta Ma(តាម៉ា)
 Kouk Lieb(កូកលាប)
 Chhuk(ឈុក)
 Doun Lei(ដូនឡី)
 Baek Chan(បែកចាន)

References

Communes of Banteay Meanchey province
Serei Saophoan District